Diascia is a genus of moths of the family Noctuidae.

Species
 Diascia hayesi Holloway 1976
 Diascia nubilata Hampson 1909
 Diascia transvitta Moore 1887

References
Natural History Museum Lepidoptera genus database

Calpinae
Moth genera